The Volta Ciclística Internacional do Paraná was a stage race held between 2004 and 2010, and from 2014 to 2015 in Brazil. It was rated 2.2 and was part of the UCI America Tour.

Winners

References

Cycle races in Brazil
2004 establishments in Brazil
Recurring sporting events established in 2004
2015 disestablishments in Brazil
Recurring sporting events disestablished in 2015
UCI America Tour races
Sport in Paraná (state)